International Peacekeeping is a peer-reviewed academic journal that publishes articles relating to peacekeeping and peace operations.

Abstracting and indexing
The journal is abstracted or indexed in several scholarly databases, including: Academic Search, America: History and Life, Historical Abstracts, SocINDEX, Scopus, PubMed, PAIS International, and Political Science Complete.

External links

References

International relations journals
Taylor & Francis academic journals
English-language journals
Publications established in 1994
5 times per year journals